Waioneke is a locality on the Te Korowai-o-Te-Tonga Peninsula of the Kaipara Harbour, in the Rodney District of New Zealand. Parakai is 22 km to the south-east, and the road continues another 14 km to the north-west. Rangitira Beach and Woodhill Forest are to the west, and Omokoiti Flats and the southern Kaipara Harbour are to the east.

History
A Māori pa existed at Waioneke prior to European settlement of the area. 
The Waioneke block was taken up in 1868 by Daniel Pollen (who later became Premier of New Zealand) and William Spearman Young, to graze cattle.

A Waioneke Road Board was formed after 1884, and was responsible for forming and maintaining roads over much of the South Head peninsula. The board was dissolved by 1899.

Waioneke was a centre of gum digging from 1880 to 1900.

Deer farming began in the area in the 1970s, and a processing plant was built in Waioneke.

The Kaipara Estate winery began in the Waioneke Valley in 1995.

Demographics
The SA1 area is part of the larger South Head statistical area.

The SA1 statistical area had a population of 183 at the 2018 New Zealand census, an increase of 69 people (60.5%) since the 2013 census, and an increase of 81 people (79.4%) since the 2006 census. There were 63 households, comprising 87 males and 96 females, giving a sex ratio of 0.91 males per female. The median age was 44.2 years (compared with 37.4 years nationally), with 45 people (24.6%) aged under 15 years, 21 (11.5%) aged 15 to 29, 93 (50.8%) aged 30 to 64, and 27 (14.8%) aged 65 or older.

Ethnicities were 93.4% European/Pākehā, 11.5% Māori, 3.3% Pacific peoples, and 3.3% other ethnicities. People may identify with more than one ethnicity.

Although some people chose not to answer the census's question about religious affiliation, 63.9% had no religion and 27.9% were Christian.

Of those at least 15 years old, 18 (13.0%) people had a bachelor's or higher degree, and 27 (19.6%) people had no formal qualifications. The median income was $33,100, compared with $31,800 nationally. 21 people (15.2%) earned over $70,000 compared to 17.2% nationally. The employment status of those at least 15 was that 81 (58.7%) people were employed full-time, 21 (15.2%) were part-time, and 3 (2.2%) were unemployed.

Education
Waioneke School is a coeducational full primary (years 1-8) school with a roll of  students as of  The school traces its origins to Mairetahi School, established in 1928. The school moved to its present site and took its current name in 1938.

Notes

External links
 Waioneke School website

Rodney Local Board Area
Populated places in the Auckland Region
Populated places around the Kaipara Harbour